Greatest Hurts: The Best of Jann Arden is a 2001 greatest hits album by Jann Arden.

In addition to Arden's best-known hits, the album also includes two new songs ("Thing For You" and "Never Mind"), two songs that Arden recorded for compilation albums ("You Don't Know Me", from the soundtrack to My Best Friend's Wedding, and "If It Be Your Will", from the Leonard Cohen tribute Tower of Song), an alternate version of "Sleepless" and a live version of Arden's most famous song, "Insensitive".

Track listing
All songs written by Jann Arden, except where noted.

"Thing for You" – 4:40 - Arden/Russell Broom
"Could I Be Your Girl" – 4:50
"The Sound Of" – 3:34
"I Would Die for You" – 4:37
"Saved" – 4:36 - Arden/CJ Vanston
"If It Be Your Will" – 5:29 - Leonard Cohen
"Insensitive" – 4:16 - Anne Loree
"Sleepless" – 4:39 - Arden/Broom
"Will You Remember Me" – 3:37
"Sorry for Myself" – 3:57 - Arden/Broom
"You Don't Know Me" – 3:28 - Eddy Arnold/Cindy Walker
"Unloved" – 4:16
"Good Mother" – 4:58 - Arden/Robert Foster
"Never Mind" – 3:42
"Sleepless (Remix)" – 4:34 - Arden/Broom
"Insensitive (Live)" – 8:13 - Loree

Year-end charts

References

2001 greatest hits albums
Jann Arden albums